Football Club Oleksandriya, commonly known as Oleksandriya, is a Ukrainian professional football club based in the city of Oleksandriya, Kirovohrad Oblast. Founded in 1948, the club plays in the Ukrainian Premier League. The year 1948 on the club's crest depicts football heritage of the club rather than the club's foundation.

History

Names
1990–2003 Polihraftekhnika
2004–2014 PFC Oleksandriya
2014–present FC Oleksandriya (merger with UkrAhroKom)

Pre-existing club (Shakhtar Oleksandriya)
FC Shakhtar Oleksandriya was established in 1948 at the production association "Oleksandriyavuhillya". At first the club played at the amateur competitions of the Ukrainian SSR until 1962 when it was accepted to the Class B which was a professional competitions. It played in Class B until the tournament was disbanded in 1971. After that the club returned to the amateurs where it played from 1971 to 1985 and 1988 to 1990. After 1990 season the club folded.

The club played its games at its own Shakhtar Stadium.

Polihraftekhnika / PFC Oleksandriya

The club was formed on 6 March 1990 as Polihraftekhnika Oleksandriya at the local printing equipment plant. The same year the club won the regional football competitions of the Kirovohrad Oblast. At same time in 1990 another Oleksandriya club Shakhtar represented the Kirovohrad region at the republican amateur level. FC Shakhtar Oleksandriya was a club of the Oleksandriyavuhillya coal mine company. At first Polihraftekhinka was leasing the Shakhtar Stadium, while building its own stadium Olimp.

From 2001 to 2003, PFC Oleksandriya played in the Ukrainian Premier League under the name of Polihraftechnika Oleksandriya, which it had since 1991. After the 2003 season the club's administration citing fiscal problems left the Professional Football League and was idle for one season.

In 2004 the president of Polihraftekhnika reestablished the club as PFC Oleksandriya, rejoined the Professional Football League and entered the Druha Liha. At the same time the Oleksandriya city administration created own football club MFC Oleksandriya which also entered the Druha Liha, however, soon thereafter the city's club withdrew from professional competitions.

Prior to the start of 2014–15 Ukrainian First League season PFC Oleksandriya going through some financial difficulties merged with UkrAhroKom Holovkivka who were also competing in the Ukrainian First League into one club and renaming themselves to FC Oleksandriya. The merger saved the Oleksandriya's club from another bankruptcy. Since the 2014 merger under the new manager Serhiy Kuzmenko (former chairman of FC UkrAhroKom), the club now claims its heritage of the Soviet miner's team of Shakhtar Oleksandriya by adding year of Shakhtar's establishment onto its club shield.

In the 2015–16 Ukrainian Premier League season, FC Oleksandriya finished 6th place, earning their best achievement in the Ukrainian top flight yet and qualifying for the third qualifying round of UEFA Europa League, where they will mark their debut in a European competition.

Stadium

The club plays its games at the Sports Complex "Nika" that was built in place of the old Shakhtar Stadium. At the new stadium Oleksandriya plays since summer of 1998.

Since 1992 Oleksandriya, at that time Polihraftekhnika, was forced to play at another city stadium "Olimp" which is located on western outskirts of the city. FC Shakhtar Oleksandriya denied its city rival to play at its home stadium "Shakhtar" which was located in the center of the city. After Shakhtar Oleksandriya became defunct, its stadium was demolished and on its place was built sports complex "Nika" which was hand over to Polihraftekhnika in 1998.

Kirovohrad Oblast rivalry
A regional rivalry exists with FC Zirka Kropyvnytskyi.

Team names

Football kits and sponsors

Current squad 
Updated 5 March 2023.

Out on loan

Former players

  Oleksandr Zabara
Sehiy Motuz

Coaches and administration

Chairmen
 1989–2014: Mykola Lavrenko
 2014–present: Serhiy Kuzmenko

Honors 

Ukrainian First League
Winners (2): 2010–11, 2014–15
Ukrainian Second League
Winners (1): 2005–06
Kirovohrad Oblast
Winner (1): 1990

League and cup history

Soviet Union

Ukraine

European record 
FC Oleksandriya played its first game of continental competition on 28 July 2016 in a home loss (0:3) to Hajduk Split. It qualified for the group stage of the competition for the first time in the 2019–20 season.

Managers 

 Oleksandr Ishchenko (Jan 1992 – June 1992)
 Yuriy Koval (Aug 1992 – Sept 1994)
 Anatoliy Buznik (Sept 1994 – June 1996)
 Yuriy Koval (July 1996 – Sept 1997)
 Serhiy Marusin (Sept 1997 – May 1998)
 Hryhoriy Ishchenko (June 1998 – June 1998)
 Anatoliy Radenko (July 1998 – Sept 1999)
 Hryhoriy Ishchenko (Sept 1999 – Nov 1999)
 Roman Pokora (Jan 2000 – June 2003)
did not exist (July 2003 – June 2004)
 Roman Pokora (July 2004 – June 2006)
 Viktor Bohatyr (July 2006 – April 2008)
 Yuriy Koval (June 2008 – Aug 2009)
 Serhiy Kovalets (Aug 2009 – Jan 2010)
 Volodymyr Sharan (Jan 2010 – Dec 2011)
 Leonid Buriak (Jan 2012 – April 2012)
 Andriy Kuptsov (April 2012 – May 2013)
 Vitaliy Pervak (May 2013 – June 2013)
 Volodymyr Sharan (June 2013 – May 2021)
 Yuriy Hura (May 2021 – present)

Reserves and academy 
The club fielded its reserve team for the first time in 1992-93 season as Polihraftekhnika-2 playing at amateur competitions.

Notes

References

External links 
 

 
Oleksandriya, PFC
Sport in Oleksandriia
Association football clubs established in 1948
1948 establishments in Ukraine
Football clubs in the Ukrainian Soviet Socialist Republic
Football clubs in Kirovohrad Oblast